David Michael Rudder OCC (born 6 May 1953) is a Trinidadian calypsonian, known to be one of the most successful calypsonians of all time. 
He performed as lead singer for the brass band Charlie's Roots. Nine years later, Rudder stepped outside the band, entering the calypso tent as a solo calypsonian in 1986, which was followed by an unprecedented rise to fame.

"Almost overnight he became a national hero of the order of Marley in Jamaica, Fela in Nigeria and Springsteen in New Jersey," wrote Daisann McClane, American journalist and Worldbeat correspondent for Rolling Stone Magazine.

Rudder's music quickly became the subject of music critics around the world: "From New York to London to Tokyo, where the Japanese have released a CD of Rudder's greatest hits complete with lyrics translated into Japanese, Rudder has been described as modern calypso's most innovative songwriter."

Early life 
Born in Belmont, Port of Spain, Trinidad and Tobago, one of nine children, Rudder spent much of his early life with his grandmother, a devout Baptist. He began singing with a calypso band at the age of 11. In his teens, he sang backup vocals in a calypso tent run by calypsonian Lord Kitchener, while earning his living as an accountant with the Trinidad Bus Company.

Career
In 1977, Rudder joined Charlie's Roots, a leading band in Trinidad and Tobago, which launched with help and sponsorship from New York-based record producer Rawlson Charles. Rudder spent many years as one of the band's vocalists.

In 1986, he came to prominence on Andy Narell's album The Hammer, which produced two big hits: "The Hammer" (a tribute to the late pannist Rudolph Charles) and "Bahia Girl". This was followed in 1987 with "Calypso Music", a brilliant encapsulation of the history of calypso. In 1988 Rudder released what is widely considered his best album to date, Haiti, which included the title track, a tribute to the glory and suffering of Haiti; "Engine Room", which captured the energy of the steel band; and "Rally 'Round the West Indies", which (with modified lyrics) became the anthem of West Indies cricket.

In 1991, four tracks performed by Rudder were included in the soundtrack of the film Wild Orchid: "Dark Secret" (two versions), "Children Of Fire (Call Of Xango)", and "Just a Carnival", which includes Rudder in the final scene in the movie "performing" on the beach. In 1996, he was appointed a Goodwill Ambassador for the United Nations Development Program (UNDP). 

In 2008, Rudder did a soca collaboration with fellow Trinidadian Machel Montano, "Oil and Music" on Machel's 2007 album Flame On. In 2011, Rudder performed a soca collaboration called "Glow" with Barbados' "Queen of Soca" Alison Hinds. He has released more than 30 albums and has performed in venues across the Caribbean, Europe, North and South America, Asia, and Africa.

Awards and honours 
On 25 October 2015, the University of the West Indies (UWI) awarded Rudder the honorary degree Doctor of Letters (D.Litt.), in recognition of his "outstanding" contributions to Caribbean culture.

On 3 July 2022, Rudder was conferred with the Order of the Caribbean Community (OCC).

Discography

Filmography

Film

Television

References

External links
 David Rudder's official website
 David Rudder's official MySpace Page
 Joy A. I. Mahabir, "Rhythm and Class Struggle: The Calypsoes of David Rudder", Jouvert 6 (3), 2002.

1953 births
20th-century Trinidad and Tobago male singers
20th-century Trinidad and Tobago singers
Calypsonians
Canadian people of Trinidad and Tobago descent
Living people
People from Port of Spain
Recipients of the Order of the Caribbean Community
Sire Records artists
Trinidad and Tobago singer-songwriters